The 2019 FNL Cup was the 8th edition of FNL Cup, a friendly association football tournament played in Cyprus.

Teams

Group stage

Group A

 Rotor Volgograd qualified for semifinals.
 Mordovia Saransk qualified for fifth place.
 FC Pyunik qualified for ninth place.
 FC Murom qualified thirteenth place.

Group B

 Shinnik Yaroslavl qualified for semifinals.
 FC Tyumen qualified for fifth place.
 Riga FC qualified for ninth place.
 Chertanovo Moscow qualified thirteenth place.

Group C

 FC Tambov qualified for semifinals.
 Ural Yekaterinburg qualified for fifth place.
 FC Khimki qualified for ninth place.
 FC Krasnodar-2 qualified thirteenth place.

Group D

 Avangard Kursk qualified for semifinals.
 Spartak-2 Moscow qualified for fifth place.
 FCI Levadia qualified for ninth place.
 Fakel Voronezh qualified thirteenth place.

Knockout stage

1-4 places
Semifinals

Finals

5-8 places
Semifinals

Finals

9-12 places
Semifinals

Finals

13-16 places
Semifinals

Finals

 Levadia refused to play 2nd half and FA awarded 3–0 for Chertanovo Moscow!

Goalscorers
4 goals

  Roman Yanushkovsky (Rotor Volgograd)

3 goals

  Benito (FC Tambov)
  Viktor Karpukhin (FC Murom)
  Vladimir Obukhov (FC Tambov)

2 goals

  Alik Arakelyan (FC Pyunik)
  Artur Miranyan (FC Pyunik)
  Artūrs Karašausks (Riga FC)
  Othman El Kabir (Ural Yekaterinburg)
  Khyzyr Appayev (FC Tambov)
  Mikhail Biryukov (Fakel Voronezh)
  Anatoli Katrich (Ural Yekaterinburg)
  Kirill Kolesnichenko (Chertanovo Moscow)
  Aleksandr Makarov (Avangard Kursk)
  Dmitri Markitesov (Spartak-2 Moscow)
  Kamil Mullin (Rotor Volgograd)
  Leon Sabua (FC Krasnodar-2)
  Mikhail Zemskov (Avangard Kursk)
  Stefan Panić (Riga FC)
  Ihor Zhurakhovskyi (FCI Levadia)

1 goal

  Kamran Aliyev (FC Khimki)
  Filipp Ivanov (Riga FC)
  Sergey Rusak (Fakel Voronezh)
  João Morelli Neto (FCI Levadia)
  Nikolay Dimitrov (Ural Yekaterinburg)
  Marek Kaljumäe (FCI Levadia)
  Artjom Komlov (FCI Levadia)
  Marko Lipp (FCI Levadia)
  Rasmus Peetson (FCI Levadia)
  Maksim Podholjuzin (FCI Levadia)
  Mark Oliver Roosnupp (FCI Levadia)
  Vladislavs Fjodorovs (Riga FC)
  Oļegs Laizāns (Riga FC)
  Aleksejs Višņakovs (Riga FC)
  Filip Mitrović (FC Tyumen)
  Kamil Biliński (Riga FC)
  Vladislav Adayev (Mordovia Saransk)
  Nikita Artemenko (Ural Yekaterinburg)
  Soltmurad Bakayev (Spartak-2 Moscow)
  Vladislav Bragin (Ural Yekaterinburg)
  Eduard Buliya (Shinnik Yaroslavl)
  Oleg Chernyshov (FC Tambov)
  Ivan Chudin (FC Tyumen)
  Kirill Folmer (Spartak-2 Moscow)
  Maksim Grigoryev (Avangard Kursk)
  Vladislav Kamilov (Shinnik Yaroslavl)
  Nikita Kirsanov (Mordovia Saransk)
  Ilya Kukharchuk (FC Khimki)
  Igor Lebedenko (Fakel Voronezh)
  Vladimir Lobkaryov (Rotor Volgograd)
  Chingiz Magomadov (Ural Yekaterinburg)
  Vladislav Masalskoe (FC Murom)
  Pavel Maslov (Spartak-2 Moscow)
  Bogdan Mishukov (FC Khimki)
  Ruslan Mukhametshin (Mordovia Saransk)
  Ruslan Navletov (Mordovia Saransk)
  Kirill Nesterov (FCI Levadia)
  German Onugkha (FC Krasnodar-2)
  Maksim Osipenko (Fakel Voronezh)
  Yevgeni Ragulkin (FC Tambov)
  Aleksandr Rudenko (Spartak-2 Moscow)
  Anzor Sanaya (Rotor Volgograd)
  Vladislav Sarveli (Chertanovo Moscow)
  Aleksandr Soldatenkov (Chertanovo Moscow)
  Vitali Stezhko (FC Krasnodar-2)
  Dmitri Tsypchenko (Chertanovo Moscow)
  Maksim Votinov (FC Tyumen)
  Aleksandr Zakuskin (FC Murom)
  Vladan Milosavljev (FC Tyumen)

1 own goal
  Yuri Lebedev (Mordovia Saransk) with FC Tyumen.
  Vitali Stezhko (FC Krasnodar-2) with FC Pyunik.

Final places

Awards
The following awards were given at the conclusion of the tournament.

References

External links

2018–19 in Russian football
2018–19 in Cypriot football
January 2019 sports events in Europe